Joliot is a surname. Notable people with the surname include:

Frédéric Joliot-Curie (1900–1958), French radiochemist and Nobel laureate
Hélène Langevin-Joliot (born 1927), French nuclear physicist
Irène Joliot-Curie (1897–1956), French radiochemist and Nobel laureate, daughter of Marie Skłodowska-Curie and Pierre Curie
Pierre Joliot (born 1932), French biologist and researcher for the CNRS

See also
Joliot (crater), large lunar impact crater that lies on the far side of the Moon, just past the eastern limb
Joliot-Curie Metro Station, station on the Sofia Metro in Bulgaria